The 2013 CONCACAF Gold Cup was the 12th CONCACAF Gold Cup competition and the 22nd CONCACAF regional championship overall in CONCACAF's fifty years of existence. The United States was the host nation.

The competition began on July 7, 2013, at the Rose Bowl, and ended with the final on July 28, 2013, at Soldier Field, with the United States defeating Panama 1–0. In this edition of the Gold Cup, Mexico participated with an alternative squad due to the main players competing at the 2013 FIFA Confederations Cup prior to the Gold Cup. Despite not playing with their full squad, they successfully reached the semi-finals where they lost to eventual runners-up Panama with a score of 1–2.

United States won the tournament, which qualified them for a play-off match against the champions of the 2015 CONCACAF Gold Cup, to decide which team would represent CONCACAF in the 2017 FIFA Confederations Cup in Russia. The playoff was played in a single match held on October 10, 2015, which Mexico won 3–2.

Qualified teams
A total of 12 teams qualified for the tournament. Three berths were allocated to North America, five to Central America, and four to the Caribbean.

Bold indicates that the corresponding team was hosting the event.

Venues
Thirty venues across the United States participated in the start of the stadium selection process with Soccer United Marketing, the event partner for the CONCACAF Gold Cup.

CONCACAF announced the 13 host cities and venues for the tournament on January 23, 2013. Each venue will host two matches, with the final being held at Chicago's Soldier Field:

Squads

Each team can register a squad of 23 players; 3 of them must be goalkeepers. Any team that qualifies for the knockout stage may replace up to four players in the squad after completion of the group stage, where the new players must come from a provisional list of 35 players chosen before the tournament.

Match officials
Each CONCACAF federation submitted a list of match officials to the CONCACAF Referee's Commission for the 2013 Gold Cup Tournament.

Referees
  Dave Gantar (Canada)
  Jeffrey Solis Calderón (Costa Rica)
  Hugo Cruz Alvarado (Costa Rica)
  Wálter Quesada (Costa Rica)
  Marcos Brea (Cuba)
  Joel Aguilar (El Salvador)
  Elmer Arturo Bonilla (El Salvador)
  Armando Castro Oviedo (Honduras)
  Héctor Rodríguez (Honduras)
  Courtney Campbell (Jamaica)
  Marco Rodríguez (Mexico)
  Javier Santos (Puerto Rico)
  Enrico Wijngaarde (Suriname)
  Mark Geiger (United States)
  Jair Marrufo (United States)

Assistant referees
  Philippe Brière (Canada)
  Joe Fletcher (Canada)
  Octavio Jara (Costa Rica)
  William Torres Mejía (El Salvador)
  Juan Francisco Zumba (El Salvador)
  Hermenerito Leal (Guatemala)
  Christian Ramírez (Honduras)
  Ricardo Morgan (Jamaica)
  Garnet Page (Jamaica)
  Marcos Quintero (Mexico)
  Marvin Torrentera (Mexico)
  Graeme Browne (St. Kitts and Nevis)
  Ramon Ricardo Louisville (Suriname)
  Eric Boria (United States)
  Sean Mark Hurd (United States)

Group stage
CONCACAF announced the groups, where the twelve teams were divided into three groups of four teams, and the match schedule for the 2013 Gold Cup on March 13, 2013.

In the group stage, if two or more teams are equal on points (including among third-placed teams in different groups), the ranking of teams will be determined as follows:
 Greater goal difference in all group matches
 Greater number of goals scored in all group matches
 Greatest number of points obtained in group matches between the teams concerned (applicable only to ranking in each group)
 Drawing of lots by the Gold Cup Organizing Committee
This was changed from previous tournaments, where head-to-head record was used as the primary tiebreaker.

All times given are US Eastern Daylight Time (UTC−4)

Group A

Group B

Group C

Ranking of third-placed teams

Knockout stage

In the knockout stages, if a match is level at the end of normal playing time, extra time shall be played (two periods of 15 minutes each) and followed, if necessary, by penalty shoot-out to determine the winners.

Quarter-finals

Semi-finals

Final

Statistics

Goalscorers
5 goals

 Gabriel Torres
 Landon Donovan
 Chris Wondolowski

4 goals
 Rodolfo Zelaya

3 goals

 Ariel Martínez
 Marco Fabián
 Blas Pérez

2 goals

 Michael Barrantes
 José Ciprian Alfonso
 Jean-Eudes Maurice
 Raúl Jiménez
 Luis Montes
 Kenwyne Jones
 Joe Corona
 Eddie Johnson
 Brek Shea

1 goal

 Ian Gaynair
 Jairo Arrieta
 Yénier Márquez
 Marvin Chávez
 Jorge Claros
 Rony Martínez
 Nery Medina
 Andy Najar
 Kévin Parsemain
 Fabrice Reuperné
 Miguel Ángel Ponce
 Jairo Jiménez
 Carlos Rodríguez
 Román Torres
 Keon Daniel
 Kevin Molino
 Mikkel Diskerud
 Clarence Goodson
 Stuart Holden
 Michael Orozco Fiscal

1 own goal
 Dalton Eiley (playing against Costa Rica)

Awards

Winners

Individual awards

Notes
1 Award is shared between the three players. It was the third time that Landon Donovan has been the competition's top scorer and also the third time he has shared the award with others.

Official song

"Cups" by actress Anna Kendrick (from the film Pitch Perfect) is the official song of the tournament.

Marketing
In December 2012, Traffic Sports USA were awarded the rights to manage the marketing of the tournament, which continued a relationship between CONCACAF and the parent company Traffic Sports Marketing. In 2015, this business deal led to charges in the 2015 FIFA corruption case, which identified bribes given from top Traffic officials to CONCACAF chairman, Jeffrey Webb.

Game notes
 On July 7, 2013 – A Guinness world record 566 mariachis performed at the half-time of the first-round game between Mexico and Panama at the Rose Bowl, Pasadena, California.

References

External links

Official website

 
CONCACAF Gold Cup tournaments
CONCACAF Gold Cup 2013
CONCACAF Gold Cup